Haft Juy Rural District is in the Central District of Qods County, Tehran province, Iran. At the National Census of 2006, its population (as a part of the former Qods District of Shahriar County) was 2,924 in 799 households. There were 2,789 inhabitants in 865 households at the following census of 2011, by which time the district had been separated from the county and Qods County established. At the most recent census of 2016, the population of the rural district was 3,137 in 950 households. The only village of the three recorded that had a reported population was Haft Juy, with 3,137 people.

References 

Qods County

Rural Districts of Tehran Province

Populated places in Tehran Province

Populated places in Qods County